N-Methyl-N-isopropyltryptamine (MiPT) is a psychedelic tryptamine, closely related to DMT, DiPT and Miprocin.

Chemistry
MiPT base, unlike many other tryptamines in their freebase form, does not decompose rapidly in the presence of light or oxygen.

In August 2019, Chadeayne et al. solved the crystal structure of MiPT fumarate. Its systematic name is [2-(1H-indol-3-yl)ethyl](methyl)propan-2-ylazanium 3-carboxyprop-2-enoate. The salt consists of a protonated tryptammonium cation and a 3-carboxyacrylate (hydrogen fumarate) anion in the asymmetric unit.

Dosage
10-25 mg is usually taken orally, with effects lasting 4–6 hours.

Effects
MiPT is said to emphasize psychedelic/entheogenic effects over sensory/hallucinogenic activity.  Users report strong mental effects, but few perceptual alterations.

Hyper sensitivity to sound as well

Legality
Sweden's public health agency suggested classifying MiPT as a hazardous substance, on May 15, 2019.

In the United States MiPT is considered a schedule 1 controlled substance as a positional isomer of Diethyltryptamine (DET). MiPT is specifically mentioned by name in the DEA Controlled Substance Orange Book.

See also 
 DiPT
 5-MeO-MiPT
 TiHKAL

References

External links 
TiHKAL entry
MiPT Entry in TiHKAL • info
Erowid vault

Psychedelic tryptamines
Designer drugs
Serotonin receptor agonists